The Crohn's & Colitis Foundation (CCF) is a volunteer-driven non-profit organization dedicated to finding cures for Crohn's disease and ulcerative colitis and improving the quality of life of children and adults affected by these digestive diseases. Founded by Shelby Modell and Irwin M. Rosenthal, and formerly known as National Foundation for Ileitis and Colitis and Crohn's and Colitis Foundation of America, it was incorporated on December 17, 1965. CCF has more than 50,000 members, served by the national headquarters, as well as over 40 chapters nationwide.

Research, educational workshops and symposia, together with CCF's scientific journal, Inflammatory Bowel Diseases, enable medical professionals to keep pace with this rapidly growing field.  The National Institutes of Health has commended the Foundation for "uniting the research community and strengthening IBD research".  The Foundation ranks third among leading health non-profits in the percentage of expense devoted to mission-critical programs, with at least 80 cents of every dollar CCF spends going toward medical research, professional education, and patient support.

Research
CCF funds studies at medical institutions, nurtures investigators at the early stages of their careers, and finances underdeveloped areas of research to find the causes of and cures for Crohn's and colitis. CCF has provided more than $150 million for Crohn's and colitis research to date.

Patient and Professional Education and Support

The Crohn's & Colitis Foundation offers literature and patient support services nationally as well as through its forty regional chapters. The Foundation provides information and education for the estimated 3.1 million inflammatory bowel disease (IBD) patients and their families through a variety of periodicals (Take Charge, Under the Microscope), books, awareness campaigns, local chapter events, Webcasts, and through its web site.[3] Due to its extensive public awareness and outreach efforts, the Foundation reaches at least one out of every 18 patients, compared to the Arthritis Foundation, with one out of every 85, or the Juvenile Diabetes Research Foundation, with one out of every 435.

Advocacy
Advocacy is a major component of the Crohn's & Colitis Foundation's mission. Its advocates are not only patients, but family members, friends, caregivers, and doctors who want to make their voices heard and see a future free from Crohn's and colitis. CCF advocates call for increased Federal funding for Crohn's and colitis research and awareness programs designed to improve the lives of patients and improved access to care.

Awareness Week
The Crohn's & Colitis Foundation designated the week of December 1–7 as Crohn's and Colitis Awareness Week in order to encourage all Americans to join in the effort to find cures for these diseases, help raise awareness and support research.

Fundraising
The Crohn's & Colitis Foundation primarily relies on the support of members and donors to continue its work. The Foundation raises funds through its local and nationwide special events, spearheaded by its national Team Challenge and Take Steps programs.

Team Challenge is the Foundation's endurance training and fundraising program, which prepares participants to run or walk a half marathon, take part in a cycling event, or experience a sprint triathlon while raising money for a cure.

Take Steps, the Foundation's largest fundraising event, mobilizes participants in over 150 local communities across the nation to come together and walk for Crohn's and colitis research.

The Foundation received $3,042,350 in grants from the United States Department of Health and Human Services between 2008 and 2015. Its corporate sponsors from 2018-2022 include:

Great Comebacks Awards
Crohn's and Colitis Foundation of America established the Great Comebacks Awards in 1984 in order to recognize individuals who have triumphed over inflammatory bowel disease. In 1991, the award was given to Dr. P. Kent Cullen, a colon surgeon who has ulcerative colitis and has undergone multiple ostomy surgeries.

Mission 
The mission of the Crohn's & Colitis Foundation is "to cure Crohn's disease and ulcerative colitis, and to improve the quality of life of children and adults affected by these diseases."

See also
 Crohn's and Colitis Canada
Crohn's and Colitis UK
 Guts UK

References

External links

Non-profit organizations based in New York City
Disability organizations based in the United States
Organizations established in 1965
Autoimmune disease organizations
Health charities in the United States
Medical and health organizations based in New York (state)